Lola Rodríguez de Tió, (September 14, 1843 – November 10, 1924), was the first Puerto Rican-born woman poet to establish herself a reputation as a great poet throughout all of Latin America.  A believer in women's rights, she was also committed to the abolition of slavery and the independence of Puerto Rico.

Early years 
Rodríguez de Tió was born Dolores Rodríguez de Astudillo y Ponce de León  in San Germán, Puerto Rico. Her father, Sebastián Rodríguez de Astudillo, was one of the founding members of the Ilustre Colegio de Abogados de Puerto Rico (literally, "Illustrious College of Attorneys," the governing body for Spanish attorneys in Puerto Rico, similar to a bar association). Lola's mother, Carmen Ponce de León, was a descendant of Juan Ponce de León, who was an explorer, and the first Spanish Governor of Puerto Rico. She too was a native of the town of San Germán and lived at what is now known as Casa de los Ponce de León. Rodríguez de Tió received her education at home where she was home-tutored. She developed a lifelong love for literature, especially for the works of Fray Luis de León which were to serve her as a source of inspiration. She was very assertive in her early years, at the age of seventeen she demanded to be allowed to wear her hair short, which went against the conventional norm of the time, a personal trademark that she kept through her life.

Political activist 

Rodríguez de Tió moved to Mayagüez, with her family. There she met Bonocio Tió Segarra, whom she married in 1863. Rodríguez de Tió became a writer and book importer who often wrote articles in the local press and was as much of an activist against the Spanish regime as was allowed by the government. After marrying Tió, she published her first book of poetry, "Mis Cantos", which sold the then amazing amount of 2,500 copies.

In 1867 and then again in 1889, Rodríguez de Tió and her husband were banished from Puerto Rico by the Spanish appointed Governors. On their first exile they went to Venezuela and on their second banishment they first moved to New York where she helped José Martí and other Cuban revolutionaries, and later to Cuba, where the couple resided until their respective deaths. Their home became a gathering point for politicians and intellectuals as well as exiled Puerto Ricans. In 1868, inspired by Ramón Emeterio Betances's quest for Puerto Rico's independence and by the attempted revolution called the Grito de Lares, she wrote the patriotic lyrics to the existing tune of La Borinqueña. In 1901, Rodríguez de Tió founded and was elected member to the Cuban Academy of Arts and Letters. She was also an inspector of the local school system.  She was well known in Cuba for her patriotic poetry about Puerto Rico and Cuba. Some of Rodríguez de Tió's best known works are "Cuba y Puerto Rico son..." (Cuba and Puerto Rico are..) and "Mi Libro de Cuba" (My Book about Cuba).

In 1919, Rodríguez de Tió returned to Puerto Rico where she was honored with a great banquet at the Ateneo Puertorriqueño after she recited her "Cantos a Puerto Rico". Lola Rodríguez de Tió died on November 10, 1924, and is buried at the Colón Cemetery in Havana, Cuba.

Legacy 
It is believed by some that the design and colors of the Puerto Rican Flag, which were adopted in 1954, came from Rodríguez de Tió's idea of having the same flag as Cuba with the colors reversed. Puerto Rico has honored Lola's memory by naming schools and avenues after her.

On May 29, 2014, The Legislative Assembly of Puerto Rico honored 12 illustrious women with plaques in the "La Plaza en Honor a la Mujer Puertorriqueña" (Plaza in Honor of Puerto Rican Women) in San Juan. According to the plaques the 12 women, who by virtue of their merits and legacies, stand out in the history of Puerto Rico. Rodríguez de Tió was among those who were honored.

Lyrics to the revolutionary version of "La Boriqueña" 

The following are the lyrics to Lola Rodríguez de Tió's 1868 revolutionary version of "La Boriqueña":

Bibliography 
As listed by the Hispanic Division of the Library of Congress, The World of 1898: The Spanish-American War.

Major works 

 A mi patria en la muerte de Corchado (1885)
 Cantares, nieblas y congojas (1968)
 Claros de sol (1968)
 Claros y nieblas (1885)
 Mi libro de Cuba (1893)
 Mi ofrenda (1880)
 Mis cantares (1876)
 Nochebuena (1887)
 Obras completas (1968)
 Poesías (1960)
 Poesías patrióticas, poesías religiosas (1968)
 Trabajos literarios (1882)
 La borinqueña (song lyrics to a native dance, 1868)

Newspaper articles by Lola Rodríguez de Tió 
 La democracia, June 07, 1905, Page 4, Image 4, Chronicling America, Library of Congress.
 La democracia., April 03, 1903, Image 1, Chronicling America, Library of Congress.
 Verses under "Autógrafo" published on La democracia., May 20, 1899, Image 3, Chronicling America, Library of Congress.
 Letter about "La cuestión Huntington," published on La democracia., December 19, 1893, Page 3, Image 3, Chronicling America, Library of Congress.
 Poem "A una golondrina" published on La democracia., November 02, 1893, Page 3, Image 3, Chronicling America, Library of Congress.
 Letter to Don Ramón Marín, published on La democracia., May 21, 1892, Page 2, Image 2, Chronicling America, Library of Congress.

Ancestry

See also 

 List of Puerto Ricans
 List of Puerto Rican writers
 Puerto Rican literature
 History of women in Puerto Rico

19th-century female leaders of the Puerto Rican Independence Movement

 María de las Mercedes Barbudo
 Mariana Bracetti

Female members of the Puerto Rican Nationalist Party

 Blanca Canales
 Rosa Collazo
 Lolita Lebrón
 Ruth Mary Reynolds
 Isabel Rosado
 Isabel Freire de Matos
 Isolina Rondón
 Olga Viscal Garriga

 Articles related to the Puerto Rican Independence Movement

 Puerto Rican Nationalist Party Revolts of the 1950s
 Puerto Rican Nationalist Party
 Ponce massacre
 Río Piedras massacre
 Puerto Rican Independence Party
 Grito de Lares
 Intentona de Yauco
 United States of Banana

Notes

References

Further reading 
The World of 1898: The Spanish American War. Lola Rodríguez de Tió. Library of Congress. 

1843 births
1924 deaths
People from San Germán, Puerto Rico
Puerto Rican poets
Puerto Rican abolitionists
Puerto Rican feminists
Puerto Rican independence activists
19th-century Puerto Rican people
19th-century Puerto Rican writers
19th-century Puerto Rican poets
19th-century Puerto Rican women writers
National anthem writers
Female revolutionaries